Tagong, also known as Lhagang is a small town in Garzê Tibetan Autonomous Prefecture of western Sichuan in southwestern China. It is located in the historical Kham region of eastern Tibet.

Tagong Monastery
It is the location of Tagong Monastery — a gompa and one of the most important in the area, in Tibetan Pel Lhagong. It was established with reference to a nearby sacred mountain, Mt. Yala or Zhara Lhaste,  in elevation.

Tagong Grassland
Tagong Grassland has an area of 712.37 square kilometres and located at 3900m in elevation.

See also
Tibetan Buddhism

References 

Buddhist monasteries in Sichuan
Kham
Kangding
Township-level divisions of Sichuan